Dennis Williams (born August 14, 1979) is a Canadian ice hockey coach currently in charge of the Everett Silvertips of the Western Hockey League. Williams was the interim head coach at his alma mater, Bowling Green, after the sudden resignation of Scott Paluch.

Career statistics

Head coaching record

References

External links

1979 births
Living people
Bowling Green Falcons men's ice hockey players
Bowling Green Falcons ice hockey coaches
Everett Silvertips coaches
Ice hockey people from Ontario
Sportspeople from Stratford, Ontario
Canadian ice hockey right wingers
Canadian ice hockey coaches